"These Are My Friends" (stylized in all lowercase) is a song by the American indie pop band Lovelytheband. The song was released as the band's second single on May 11, 2018.

Background
Upon the single's May 2018 release, lead vocalist Mitchy Collins described the song's meaning, saying, "This is a song about all of the people in my life as well as the good and bad that lives inside me...Because whether or not I get along with them all the time, I love them. They make me who I am. I have to embrace all, if I didn't I wouldn't be me."

Music video
The single's official music video, directed by Hoeg/Beach, was released on July 13, 2018, via Red Music.

Reception
The independent music blog frtyfve, which highlighted the song as its "track of the day", described the single as "a powerful ode to friendship and battling through the hard times with the right people. With an incredible catchy singalong chorus, it is likely that the single will compete with "broken" in streaming figure terms."

Charts

References

2018 singles
2018 songs
Lovelytheband songs
Another Century Records singles